This article provides details of international football games played by the Kyrgyzstan national football team from 2020 to present.

Results

2021

2022

Forthcoming fixtures
The following matches are scheduled:

References

Football in Kyrgyzstan
results
2020s in Kyrgyzstani sport